Daniel García-Peña Jaramillo (b. 1957) is a Colombian university professor, historian, journalist and politician. He served as High Commissioner for Peace for the government of Ernesto Samper between August 1995 and August 1998, was director of Planeta Paz and professor in the Department of Political Science at the National University of Colombia. He graduated as a historian at Belmont Abbey College, North Carolina, in the United States. He was also Professor of History at the Universidad de los Andes and participates as a political analyst in opinion programs in print media, radio and television. He was a counselor of the Democratic Alliance M-19 for a special legislative commission.

In 2002, García-Peña led Luis Eduardo Garzón's political campaign for the Presidency of Colombia during the 2002 Colombian presidential elections. In 2003, he led Garzón's campaign for Mayor of Bogotá during regional elections in Colombia.

He is the grandson of Roberto García-Peña and cousin of Roberto Posada García-Peña and Rodrigo Pardo García-Peña.

Secretary General of the PDA
He was secretary general of the Alternative Democratic Pole (PDA), despite the internal opposition that it aroused between pole movements of the Moir and the South Pole. Garcia-Pena resigned on June 9, 2008.

References

Alternative Democratic Pole politicians
Living people
Year of birth missing (living people)
Colombian politicians